Manage is a municipality of Wallonia located in the province of Hainaut, Belgium.

On January 1, 2006, Manage had a total population of 22,341. The total area is 19.60 km2 which gives a population density of 1,140 inhabitants per km2.

The municipality consists of the following districts: Bellecourt, Bois-d'Haine, Fayt-lez-Manage, La Hestre, and Manage.

References

External links
 

Municipalities of Hainaut (province)